Vincent Vitetta (1 October 1925 in Nice, France – 12 April 2021) was a French cyclist. Professional from 1951 to 1961, he was the winner of the Tour d'Algérie in 1952. He ended his career as an independent racer in 1961.

Major results

1952
Tour d'Algérie
2nd overall GP Algiers
9th overall Critérium du Dauphiné Libéré

1953
GP Côte d'Azur
2nd overall Circuit du Mont Blanc
2nd overall Genova-Nice
2nd overall GP Minaret - Bourg-en-Bresse
7th overall Grand Prix du Midi libre

1954
1st stage Grand Prix du Midi libre
8th overall Tour de France
7th overall GP Algiers
13th overall Milan–San Remo

1955
10th overall Critérium du Dauphiné Libéré
16th overall Tour de France

1956
3rd overall Grand Prix de Cannes
4th overall Marseille-Nice

1957
2nd overall Bourg-Geneva-Bourg

1960
2nd overall Trophy Nice-Matin
2nd overall Tour de la Côte d'Ivoire

Results at the Grand Tours

Tour de France
1951: 33rd
1952: 20th
1953: 59th
1954: 8th
1955: 16th
1956: 53rd

Giro d'Italia
1955: 74th

References

1925 births
2021 deaths
French male cyclists
Cyclists from Nice